Shoreham is a seaside surfing town on the Mornington Peninsula in Melbourne, Victoria, Australia,  south-east of Melbourne's Central Business District, located within the Shire of Mornington Peninsula local government area. Shoreham recorded a population of 679 at the 2021 census.

Shoreham is in the southern Mornington Peninsula region on the Western Port, located on its shores around the mouth of Stoney Creek. It is a coastal recreation resort rich in artistic history, notable for its pine-covered cliffs, foreshore reserve, and Honeysuckle Beach.

History

Shoreham began as a port for timber exports from the surrounding area. Early reports of the area suggested the region was "thick with honeysuckle and sheoak" and early settlers in the Balnarring and Hastings region were involved in wattle bark stripping and cutting piles and sleepers for shipping to Melbourne via the town.
Shoreham Post Office opened on 1 October 1881.

Artists

Shoreham has a rich artistic history in Australian art, as a place where artists have resided and painted, most notably Clifton Pugh, Colin Colahan, John Perceval and Charles Blackman. Several homes and paintings bear testimony to their work. There is also iron work by Matcham Skipper and frescos by Clifton Pugh.

Today

Shoreham today is a small coastal town containing a post office, tennis courts, community hall and CFA, picnic and barbecue facilities, and a boat launch access over Honeysuckle beach. Whilst predominantly the refuge of private homes and farms, there are various accommodation options such as B&Bs, a caravan park and camping sites.

Shoreham is served by the bus route 782 bus route operated by Ventura Bus Lines between Frankston railway station and Flinders. The town is also within 15 minutes driving distance of the Stony Point railway line, which connects travellers to the metropolitan Melbourne railway network.

See also
 Shire of Flinders – Parts of Shoreham were previously within this former local government area.
 Shire of Hastings – Parts of Shoreham were previously within this former local government area.

References

Mornington Peninsula
Coastal towns in Victoria (Australia)
Western Port